Hudson Bend is a census-designated place (CDP) in Travis County, Texas, United States. The population was 2,981 at the 2010 census.

Geography

Hudson Bend is located at  (30.415400, -97.921973), 16 miles (26 km) northwest of Austin on Lake Travis.

According to the United States Census Bureau, the CDP has a total area of 6.7 square miles (17.3 km2), of which, 4.0 square miles (10.3 km2) of it is land and 2.7 square miles (7.0 km2) of it (40.27%) is water.

Demographics
As of the census of 2000, there were 2,369 people, 1,065 households, and 614 families residing in the CDP. The population density was 594.4 people per square mile (229.2/km2). There were 1,225 housing units at an average density of 307.4/sq mi (118.5/km2). The racial makeup of the CDP was 94.30% White, 0.13% African American, 0.76% Native American, 0.51% Asian, 0.04% Pacific Islander, 3.00% from other races, and 1.27% from two or more races. Hispanic or Latino of any race were 6.75% of the population.

There were 1,065 households, out of which 25.5% had children under the age of 18 living with them, 47.7% were married couples living together, 6.2% had a female householder with no husband present, and 42.3% were non-families. 32.3% of all households were made up of individuals, and 5.1% had someone living alone who was 65 years of age or older. The average household size was 2.22 and the average family size was 2.82.

In the CDP, the population was spread out, with 20.6% under the age of 18, 4.9% from 18 to 24, 33.0% from 25 to 44, 32.0% from 45 to 64, and 9.4% who were 65 years of age or older. The median age was 42 years. For every 100 females, there were 117.3 males. For every 100 females age 18 and over, there were 116.8 males.

The median income for a household in the CDP was $61,406, and the median income for a family was $77,463. Males had a median income of $42,679 versus $34,338 for females. The per capita income for the CDP was $37,560. About 1.5% of families and 3.5% of the population were below the poverty line, including 2.9% of those under age 18 and 1.5% of those age 65 or over.

Education
Hudson Bend is served by the Lake Travis Independent School District (LTISD).
The zoned elementary school is Lake Travis Elementary School in Lakeway
The zoned middle school is Hudson Bend Middle School
All LTISD students are assigned to Lake Travis High School

Public library
The Lake Travis Community Library (LTCL) in Lakeway serves Hudson Bend. It originally opened in Lake Travis High School in 1985. Area voters approved the creation of the library district serving the library was created in May 2004. Haythem Dawlett donated the land for the library in March 2011, and the library moved into the current location in February 2013.

References

Census-designated places in Texas
Census-designated places in Travis County, Texas
Census-designated places in Greater Austin